Federico Accornero (born 5 February 2004) is an Italian professional footballer who plays as an attacking midfielder for  club Genoa.

Club career 

Born and raised in Genoa, Accornero started playing football at grassroots clubs Polis Genova and Foce, before joining Genoa's youth academy in 2011. He came through the club's youth ranks, reaching the final of the under-17 national championship in 2021, while starting playing for the under-19 squad in the same year.

On 6 March 2023, Accornero made his professional debut for Genoa, coming on as a substitute for Albert Guðmundsson at the 82th minute of a 4–0 Serie B win against Cosenza.

International career 

Accornero has represented Italy at various youth international levels, having played for the under-15, under-16, under-18 and under-19 national teams. 

He was included in the squad that took part in the 2022 Mediterranean Games in Oran, Algeria, where Italy eventually won the silver medal after losing to France in the final match.

Style of play 
Accornero started playing football as a central midfielder, before being moved to an attacking role. Despite operating mainly as a number 10, he can also play as an advanced forward or a left winger.

An ambidextrous forward, he has been regarded for his agility, his dribbling skills and his work rate. Moreover, he has shown to be equally effective as an assist-man and a goal-scorer.

Although he was compared to Alexis Sánchez due to his characteristics, he cited Albert Guðmundsson and Mattia Aramu, two of his team-mates at Genoa, as his biggest sources of inspiration.

Personal life 
Accornero's parents own a seaside resort in Genoa.

He is a long-life supporter of Genoa.

Career statistics

References

External links 

 
 

2004 births
Living people
People from Genoa
Sportspeople from Genoa
Italian footballers
Italy youth international footballers
Association football forwards
Serie B players
Genoa C.F.C. players